MILO: A Journal For Serious Strength Athletes was a quarterly journal dedicated to strength sports, published by IronMind. It was published continually from April 1993 to March 2018. The magazine was named after Milo of Croton.

History and profile
Randall J. Strossen was the publisher and editor-in-chief. It was part of IronMind Enterprises, Inc. The journal covered topics such as Olympic-style weightlifting, strongman,  Highland Games, powerlifting, general weight training, and fitness, arm wrestling, grip strength, stones and stonelifting, and similar subjects.

References

  Ned Beaumont, Savage Science of Streetfighting (2001), p. 177
  Brooks D. Kubik, Dinosaur Training (1996), p. 192

External links
 

1993 establishments in California
2018 disestablishments in California
Defunct magazines published in the United States
Magazines established in 1993
Magazines disestablished in 2018
Magazines published in California
Quarterly magazines published in the United States
Sports magazines published in the United States